Celypha ermolenkoi is a species of moth of the family Tortricidae. It is found in Ukraine, on the Crimea and in Kyrgyzstan.

The wingspan is 15–17 mm. Adults have been recorded on wing in June.

References

Moths described in 1980
Olethreutini